Zahoor Ahmed Buledi is a Pakistani politician who is the current Provincial Minister of the Balochistan for Finance, in office since 30 August 2018. He has been a member of Provincial Assembly of the Balochistan since August 2018.
Mir Zahoor Ahmed Buledi, basically from Buleda, a tehsil of Kech/ Turbat District, and a graduate from Forman Christian College Lahore. During his student life, he participated in various social and political activities. After his graduation, He contested elections for a provincial assembly seat back in 2008 for the first time.  He was elected as member provincial assembly of Balochistan and served as a Provincial Minister for Gwadar and Coastal Development until 2013. During 2013-18,  

Mir Zahoor Buledi focused on his higher education and by dint of efforts and endeavors he acquired the Master Degree in International Relations from University of Balochistan, Quetta. He also participated in several short courses conducted in foreign countries i.e. United States, United Kingdom and China during the foregoing period. Refurbished with Masters Degree and numerous informative and capacity building courses and rejuvenated with the zeal of public-service he once again contested elections for a  general seat of Provincial Assembly of Balochistan in 2018 and got elected. He is currently serving as Finance Minister of Balochistan. As an elected public representative, he has been exerting all his efforts and energy through legislation and policy making for socio-economic development  and progress. Politically, he has always stood up and supported liberal democracy, human rights, women rights and right of minorities in the province of Balochistan and Pakistan.

Political career
He was elected to the Provincial Assembly of the Balochistan as a candidate of Balochistan Awami Party (BAP) from Constituency PB-45 (Kech-I) in 2018 Pakistani general election.

On 27 August 2018, he was inducted into the provincial Balochistan cabinet of Chief Minister of Jam Kamal Khan. On 30 August, he was appointed as Provincial Minister of Balochistan for information.

References

Living people
Balochistan Awami Party MPAs (Balochistan)
Provincial ministers of Balochistan
Year of birth missing (living people)